= Francis DeMars =

American politician (1842–1904)

Francis DeMars (July 28, 1842 – September 24, 1904) was a member of the South Carolina House of Representatives in 1870, representing Orangeburg and a city official in Orangeburg.

He served in a regiment from New York during the American Civil War and settled in Orangeburg after the war.
